Bullied to Death is a 2016 Italian-American film written and directed by Giovanni Coda, starring Tendal Mann. The film, shot in Italy and performed in English, was presented by the director and premiered during the 2016 edition of the Torino GLBT Film Festival. Bullied to Death is the second episode of the trilogy on gender-based violence started by the director with the film Il Rosa Nudo.

Plot
The film is inspired by the true story of a fourteen-year-old American boy who died by suicide in the wake of a dramatic sequence of serious acts related to school bullying and cyberbullying. Bonded to this story are those of other young gay, lesbian, and transgender teenage victims of homophobic attacks, who have been killed or induced to commit suicide in different parts of the world. On May 17, 2071, sixty years after the death of the protagonist and during the International Day Against Homophobia, Transphobia and Biphobia, a group of artists gather together to create a commemorative performance that will last the whole day.

Awards and official selections
Official Selection at Torino GLBT Film Festival 2016, Turin, Italy.<ref>Bullied to Death   (Retrieved  25-06-2016)</small>.</ref> 
Official Selection at XX V-Art Festival Internazionale Immagine d'Autore, Cagliari, Italy.  
Official Selection at 30° Festival Mix, Milan, Italy.<ref>Bullied to Death  (Retrieved 25-06-2016)</small>.</ref>  
Best Avant-Garde Innovation Award at Melbourne Documentary Film Festival 2016, Australia.<ref>Doppia premiere internazionale per "Bullied to Death" (Retrieved 25-06-2016)</small>.</ref>  
Official Selection at Macon Film Festival 2016, Usa.
Jury Special Mention at Iris Prize Festival 2016, Cardiff, U.K.
Film of the Week at Amsterdam New Renaissance Film Festival 2017, Amsterdam, NL.
Special Mention Best Female Performance to Assunta Pittaluga at Italian Film Festival 2016, Cardiff, U.K.
Special Mention Best Male Performance to Sergio Anrò at Italian Film Festival 2016, Cardiff, U.K.
Jury Special Mention at Los Angeles Underground Film Festival, Los Angeles, USA.
Best Feature Film Prize at Omovies Festival, Naples, Italy.
Best Feature Film Prize at  L'Aquila LGBT Film Festival, L'Aquila, Italy.
Humanity Award 2017 at Amsterdam New Renaissance Film Festival 2017, Amsterdam, NL.

See also
 Homophobia
 Violence against LGBT people
 It Gets Better Project

Further reading
 Bullied to Death, repubblica.it (Retrieved 25-06-2016);
 Bullied to Death, filmtv.it (Retrieved 25-06-2016);
 Il videoartista cagliaritano autore cult del cinema indipendente, La Nuova (Retrieved 25-06-2016);
 Aldo Lotta In Bullied to Death l’urlo di Giovanni Coda contro l’omofobia, Il Manifesto Sardo (Retrieved 25-06-2016);
 Bullied to Death: il film sul bullismo debutta al TGLFF, gaypost (consultato in data 25-06-2016);
 Bullied to death: il grido delle vittime dell'omofobia, L'Unione Sarda (Retrieved 25-06-2016);
 Sara Bavato, Quando il bullismo uccide, Il Globo, Melbourne, 08-06-2013 (Retrieved 25-06-2016);
 Bullied to Death, a film by Giovanni Coda, The Pink Snout (Retrieved 25-06-2016);
 Fabio Canessa «Bullizzati sino alla morte» Giovanni Coda racconta l’atroce violenza dell’omofobia, La Nuova Sardegna (Retrieved 26-06-2016);
 Cataldo Dino Meo Bullied to Death, distorsioni.net (Retrieved 04-06-2016);
 Roberto Mariella Bullied to Death, cinemagay.it'' (Retrieved 04-06-2016);

References

External links

 
 

2016 drama films
2016 films
2016 LGBT-related films
Italian LGBT-related films
Italian drama films
English-language Italian films
Homophobia in fiction
Films shot in Sardinia
LGBT-related drama films
2010s English-language films